Angelique V. Nixon is a Bahamas-born, Trinidad-based, feminist writer, artist, academic and activist.

Nixon teaches at  The University of the West Indies St. Augustine's, and is a director of CAISO: Sex & Gender Justice organization in Trinidad and Tobago.

She is the author of the 2015 non-fiction book Resisting Paradise: Tourism, Diaspora, and Sexuality in Caribbean Culture.

Early life and education 
Nixon was born in The Bahamas and raised in Trinidad.

Nixon has a bachelor's degree in accounting and humanities from Nova Southeastern University, a master's degree in English from Florida Atlantic University, and a PhD in English from the University of Florida. She also has a graduate certificate in women’s studies and gender research from the University of Florida.

She did a postdoctoral fellowship in Africana studies at New York University, focusing on migration and theories of Africana.

Career 
Nixon works, writers and makes art about intersectional feminism, Black liberation and decolonization.

Nixon is a tenured lecturer at the University of the West Indies at St. Augustine's Institute for Gender and Development Studies where, from 2017 to 2021, she led the Sexual Culture of Justice program that produced local and regional analysis on how to approach sexual and gender-based violence and discrimination towards LGBTQI+ people. Her teaching focusses on African diaspora literature, diaspora, migration, tourism, gender and sexuality, Caribbean and post-colonial studies.

She is a director of the Trinidad and Tobago based feminist LGBTQI+ organization CAISO: Sex & Gender Justice. In 2021, Nixon called on the government of Trinidad and Tobago to declare a national emergency on gender based violence.

Selected publications 

 Saltwater Healing: A Myth Memoir and Poems, Poinciana Paper Press 2013
 Resisting Paradise: Tourism, Diaspora, and Sexuality in Caribbean Culture, University Press of Mississippi, 2015, ISBN 978-1496813268 - 2016 winner of the Caribbean Studies Association's 2016 Barbara T. Christian Award, Best Humanities Book.

Personal life 
Nixon is queer; she lives in Trinidad.

References

External links 

 Nixon's official website
 CAISO: Sex & Gender Justice - official webpage

Living people
Bahamian women writers
Bahamian activists
Bahamian writers
Bahamian academics
Trinidad and Tobago writers
Trinidad and Tobago LGBT rights activists
Trinidad and Tobago artists
Trinidad and Tobago women writers
Nova Southeastern University alumni
Florida Atlantic University alumni
University of Florida alumni
New York University alumni
University of the West Indies academics
Year of birth missing (living people)
Trinidad and Tobago LGBT people
Bahamian women artists